The Irkut MC-21 is a single-aisle airliner, developed in Russia by the Yakovlev Design Bureau and produced by its parent Irkut, a branch of the United Aircraft Corporation (UAC), itself a 92%-owned subsidiary of Russia's state-owned aviation giant Rostec.

The program was launched in 2007. Irkut rolled out the first MC-21-300 on 8 June 2016 and first flew the aircraft on 28 May 2017. 

The twinjet has a carbon fibre reinforced polymer wing and is powered by Aviadvigatel PD-14 turbofans or Pratt & Whitney PW1000G engines.

It will be followed by a shortened MC-21-200 version. 

By July 2018, it had received 175 firm orders.

In early 2022, international sanctions against Russia were imposed due to the Russian invasion of Ukraine. Irkut Corporation was placed on the sanctions lists of the United States, Canada, Switzerland and Ukraine, while United Aircraft Corporation was placed on the sanctions lists of the United States, European Union, Japan, Switzerland, France, Belgium and Ukraine, and the European Union Aviation Safety Agency (EASA) suspended all work on type certification of the MC-21. To circumvent the sanctions, Irkut intends to use only Russian avionics and engines. On 7 April 2022 Mikhail Mishustin said that the substitution of domestic assemblies should be completed within 2–3 years, and the Russian government expects that the percentage of domestic components in the MC-21 will be 97% by 2022–2024, making it independent of imported equipment.

Naming
In  Magistral'nyj Samoljot 21 veka translates as "mainline aircraft of the 21st century".

In 2013, Russian deputy premier Dmitry Rogozin indicated that it would be designated Yak-242 once it enters serial production, the name of a 1990s proposal of an aircraft of similar size.
In 2014, Oleg Demchenko, the president of Irkut at the time, also preferred the Yak-242 name, claiming it would better reflect the design bureau behind the aircraft, however, he has also said that any of these renaming decisions would be made after the aircraft first flight and certification work.

Development

The program was launched in 2007, planning a 2016 introduction.
In 2009, the MC-21 was in the "pre-design" phase, with projected completion of the first prototype in 2013 and the first flight in 2014. By June 2011, the "pre-design" phase was completed and the "working design" stage was under way with three-dimensional models and drawings for subcontractors and suppliers, to be completed by mid-2012. In February 2012, Russian deputy prime minister Dmitry Rogozin announced it was slated to begin certification tests in 2015/2016 and to enter production in 2020.
The unit cost of the MC-21-200 is US$ 72 million, and US$91 million for the MC-21-300.

On 8 June 2016, the -300 was rolled-out in Irkutsk, East Siberia, six years after program launch and with 175 orders. It could be the first commercial aircraft to use out of autoclave composite manufacturing for its wings. The program faces domination of the single-aisle market by Airbus and Boeing. Russian protectionism is hampering access to critical western suppliers for the avionics, landing gear, hydraulics, power systems and engines. Its introduction was delayed to the end of 2018. It is comparable to the Airbus A320neo or Boeing 737 MAX and could replace the outgoing Tu-134, Tu-154, Tu-204 and Yak-42.

Ground testing

In February 2017, it passed 90% of the static ultimate load test (150% of the highest load in operation) at the TsAGI but failed the 100% test for which the wingbox will need  reinforcements: this is common for new airliners like the Airbus A380, Boeing 787 or Mitsubishi MRJ, aiming for the smallest possible margin to avoid excess weight; it passed the limit load test (highest load during flight) which enables flight testing which should start in April. Cracks developed at the point of contact between the titanium beam and the composite wing skin in the wingbox.
The reinforced wingbox withstood a load exceeding specifications without damage in mid-November at TsAGI Moscow.

In May 2017, it was undergoing systems ground testing including its auxiliary power unit and taxiing tests.
After completing taxi and runway roll tests, its maiden flight was scheduled for late May 2017 with Pratt & Whitney Geared Turbofan engines, certified in September 2016 in Russia.
The Russian certification was targeted for 2018 and the European Aviation Safety Agency certificate for 2019.

Flight testing

On 28 May 2017 MC-21 made its successful maiden flight in Irkutsk.
The maiden flight was originally scheduled for December 2016, then to April before finally taking place in May.

Following this maiden flight, trade and industry minister Denis Manturov claims it will have 12–15% lower operating costs than contemporaries, generating a demand for over 1,000 MC-21s between 2017 and 2037.
Aeroflot expects delivery of the first aircraft through Rostec subsidiary Aviakapital leasing in 2019.
Its early production rate is projected for 20 aircraft per year.

In August 2017, the first prototype performed nine test flights, analysing stability and controllability in various configurations, altitude, altitude/speed sensors accuracy and engine operation.
Its software is adjusted by the results as it is fitted with over 500 strain gauges measuring in-flight loading on the airframe, to verify the initial design, for "several weeks".
A second prototype is finalised while three other prototypes are undergoing construction; production of 70 MC-21s annually is planned for 2024.
Irkut began the second testing phase on 13 September with an eventless 2-hour flight.
The phase will extend the mass, centering, speed and altitude envelope.

The flight test programme started on 2 November with a 3-hour flight reaching .
Before being flown to Moscow, 20 flights were conducted in Irkutsk.
In November, the second prototype was prepared for flight-tests, followed in 2018 by the third for which final assembly has started.

EASA approval was targeted for mid-2020. Certification testing was to start at the end of 2018 for a mid-2019 Russian type certification after a 1,150 flights effort.
Entry into service was then planned for the second half of 2019 with the first five deliveries and within five years UAC plans to ramp up production to 70 aircraft per year.

The second test aircraft was in final assembly in January 2018 and was to join the flight-test campaign in the first quarter.
It was to fly in late February or early March 2018.
Its construction was completed by March end.
It was scheduled to fly in April 2018, and the third in the 2018 fourth quarter.
On 20 July 2018, it flew from Irkutsk to the Gromov Flight Research Institute near Moscow in six hours.

Production started in 2018, certification slipped into late 2019 and the first delivery to 2020.
For three years after 2018, UAC plans to invest ₽ billion ($ million) for the MC-21.
By October 2018, two EASA test pilots and a test engineer test flew the plane in preparation for European certification.
On 3 December, a fuselage was delivered to the Central Aerohydrodynamic Institute at Moscow-Zhukovsky for fatigue testing: repetitive loads will simulate 180,000 cycles.
By then, the third flying prototype was assembled, its systems installed and it was undergoing final adjustments, a fourth test aircraft
was in assembly, as the first production fuselage.
After completing assembly, the third MC-21 was transferred to the flight-test station on 25 December.

By early 2019, the two prototypes had completed 122 test sorties, and following Western sanctions against Russia, 1.6 billion roubles ($24.2 million) of additional subsidies were allocated to the program for 2019, before 4.11 billion roubles in 2020 and 4.81 billion roubles in 2021: Russian content was aimed at 97% by 2022.
The program cost is 438 billion rubles (US$ Bn)
By then, certification trials were expected to end in the second half of 2020 before first delivery to Aeroflot by year end.

On 18 February 2019, Rostec delayed entry into service another year to 2021 due to US sanctions, while another 240–250 billion rubles ($3.62–3.78 billion) is needed to complete its development.
On 16 March 2019, the third test aircraft, which has been fully fitted out with a passenger cabin, made its maiden flight. After painting at Ulyanovsk, on 13 May 2019 it joined the other two test aircraft at Moscow-Zhukovsky Airport, where the certification programme is being conducted.

On 17 September 2019, the third test aircraft made its first international flight from Moscow-Zhukovsky to Istanbul Atatürk Airport. The aircraft was presented to Turkish Airlines at Teknofest Istanbul, and co-production projects were proposed to Turkey.
The fourth flight-test aircraft was rolled out on 28 November 2019, and performed its first flight on 25 December 2019.

Transition to Russian-produced parts

In January 2020, Irkut received the first PD-14 engines for installation.
The PD-14-powered MC-21-310 made its maiden flight on 15 December from Irkutsk.

In December 2021, Irkut carried out the maiden flight of the first MC-21 to be manufactured with domestically produced composite wings.

By October 2022, Irkut had fitted the first flight test aircraft with PD-14 engines and other domestically produced components, and flown a test sortie in the new configuration. The aircraft will participate in the certification programme, targeted to be complete by the end of 2022.

In 2022, after international sanctions against Russia were imposed due to the 2022 Russian invasion of Ukraine, Rosaviatsia announced that in a resulting change of plans Russia will only use a domestic engine. The original model – the MC-21-300 powered by Pratt & Whitney PW1000G engines – will not enter service, and instead production will have to wait for the MC-21-310, powered by the Russian Aviadvigatel PD-14, built by the United Engine Corporation. The MC-21-300 consists of between 40% and 50% imported parts, and Irkut will need to replace those that were to be supplied by the sanctioning countries. The need to use Russian avionics will delay first shipment to either late 2024 or 2025.
As part of a plan announced in June 2022, aimed at bringing the proportion of domestically produced aircraft to 80% of the Russian fleet by the end of the decade, deliveries of the MC-21 are expected to start in 2024 and reach a delivery rate of 72 per year by 2029.

Introduction
Aeroflot expected to lease 50 MC-21-300s from Aviakapital for 12 to 18 years and a monthly lease of less than $437,282 each. By 2018, they were to be delivered from the first quarter of 2020 to the third quarter of 2026, with EASA certification targeted for early 2021.
Powered by PW1400Gs or possibly PD-14s for the second half, Irkut guaranteed less than  fuel burn on a  route with a  tailwind.
They were guaranteed to reach 2,100h and a dispatch reliability of 96% for the first year, rising to 2,900h and 97% in the second year then 3,750h and 98.5% in the third year.

In October 2018, fuselage panels for the first customer MC-21 were completed by United Aircraft Corporation subsidiary Aviastar.
In early 2019, the annual output was targeted from 20 initially to 72 airframes in 2025, towards 100 and possibly 120 later for a forecast of 850 deliveries.

In July 2021 it was reported that Aeroflot would launch the MC-21-300 with its regional subsidiary Rossiya Airlines in summer 2022.
In September 2021, Evgeny Ditrikh, CEO of GTLK (Public Transport Leasing Company of Russia), stated that the MC-21 project is in need of new government grants.

By the end of December 2021, Russian type certification was granted for the MC-21-300 variant powered by PW1400G engines, ahead of its planned introduction with its launch operator Rossiya.
Additional testing was still needed for high-altitude, strong crosswinds, and low and high temperatures operations.
The initial target market is for 800 airframes in Russia over the next 20 years.

Design

The design is based on the never-realized, twin-engine Yakovlev Yak-242 as a development of the three-engine Yakovlev Yak-42.

Airframe
The United Aircraft Corporation (UAC) subsidiary AeroComposit developed the vacuum infusion process to produce the wingbox and wing panels.
The vertical and horizontal fins and wingbox are also composite and the high aspect ratio wing is a supercritical airfoil.
The MC-21 design is more innovative than the C919: it is the only airliner with a carbon fibre wingbox made with resin infused dry fibre, cured in an oven out of autoclave. The initial design included ~33% composite materials, increasing to 40–45% with the composite wing.

By January 2019, U.S. sanctions against Russia have interrupted the supply of foreign raw materials, on which the UAC relied to produce composite parts. The UAC started looking for either domestically produced or Chinese replacements, maintaining that the wing box and consoles would still consist of polymeric composites. By then, a metal wing was "no longer on the agenda" according to the Central Aerohydrodynamic Institute (TsAGI). In March 2019, AeroComposit reported that it had produced the first fuselage centre section and wing box from domestic materials.

The fuselage of the MC-21 is mostly made of lightweight aluminium–lithium alloy, which accounts for 40% of the airframe's structural weight. 
It is  wider than the A320/C919 and  wider than the 737, for a  aisle allowing passing others or a trolley.
Its  MTOW is the same as the almost 5 m (16.5 ft.) shorter A320neo, and is  lighter than the almost  shorter 737-8, for similar two-class layouts of 162 to 165 while the 737-8 and A320neo have  more range.

Engines

The  thrust class Pratt & Whitney PW1000G was selected in December 2009.  The design configuration now calls for the PW1400G-JM geared turbo fan engine to be installed on one version. Russia decided to have both an internal and external supplier for the engine and nacelle for greater flexibility in controlling rate and price.

The Russian engine will be the  Aviadvigatel PD-14.
United Engine Corporation (UEC) planned to deliver five PD-14s for the MC-21 by the end of 2018, to start flight tests in 2019 for the MC-21 variant certification in 2021. 
By October 2018, the PD-14 had received its Rosaviatsia type certification.
By October 2019, PD-14 flight-testing on the MC-21 was delayed until 2020.

Systems
In August 2009, Hamilton Sundstrand, a subsidiary of United Technologies, announced it will provide electric power generation and distribution equipment for $2.3 billion over 20 years of production.
Rockwell Collins and its Russian partner Avionika were selected to supply the MC-21's avionics.
Honeywell, Thales and Elbit Systems supply avionics with nine 12-inch multifunction displays, electronic flight bags, synthetic vision and enhanced vision systems.
The MC-21 will be the first airliner with active side-sticks, supplied by UTC Aerospace Systems.
It has Fly-By-Wire controls.
It has a glass cockpit with side-stick controls and an optional Head-up display.

Goodrich Corporation, also a subsidiary of United Technologies, along with Aviapribor was selected to provide the flight control system actuators.
Zodiac Aerospace, Eaton and Meggitt provide other components. Interior furnishings will come from Zodiac Aerospace, coordinated from C&D Zodiac in Huntington Beach, California. Innovations from Zodiac Aerospace in Carson, California, will be incorporated in the water and waste systems.

There are two types of auxiliary power units (APU) designed with specifications suitable for MC-21: HGT750 from Honeywell Aerospace and TA18-200 developed by Aerosila.

Component suppliers
Initially it was assumed that the share of domestic components for the MC-21 would be 38%, but due to sanctions in the wake of the 2022 Russian invasion of Ukraine the Russian government ordered a target figure of 98% by 2023, making it independent of imported components.

In July 2021 a composite wing made of Russian materials was docked to the fuselage of the aircraft.

The fuselage is designed and manufactured by Irkut Corporation and Yakovlev Design.

The chassis were supplied by the company "Hydromash" from Nizhny Novgorod.

The cockpit and part of the aircraft's avionics were developed and supplied by the Concern Radio-Electronic Technologies and Rockwell Collins with the participation of personnel from the Russian company "Avionika".

It is possible to use both imported APU and the Russian one developed and produced in NPP "Aerosila".

For personnel training, the Scientific and Production Russian Company "Systems of Complex Simulators" developed and manufactured a number of simulators, including a number of flight simulators of different degrees of realism, emergency procedures simulator, firefighting simulator, service simulator, engineering simulator for technician training.

Variants
In 2009, the MS-21-200 was designed around 150 passengers in single-class configuration, to be followed by a 181-seat -300 and 212-seat -400 with basic and extended-range models, plus a very-long-range MS-21-200LR
MC-21-300
Standard model with PW1400G engine, 163 passengers in two class, up to 211, up to  range
MC-21-310
Standard model with PD-14 engine
MC-21-200
Shortened version with 132 passengers in two class, up to 165, up to  range
MC-21-400

Proposed
Initially a 132-seats MC-21-100 variant was planned but then superseded by the Superjet 100 development.
The small variant with a capacity of 130- to 150-seat was proposed with commonality with the Sukhoi Superjet 130.

UAC considers more developments for the MC-21 by 2035. These include: a -400 with  engines for a  MTOW, a -500, a -600 with  engines, and a -700 with  engines, as well as a MC-21X with a  tons MTOW for a  km range.
Ilyushin Finance wants a MC-21-400 stretch for up to 256 seats and plans to buy 20 to 60 of them.
The 250-passenger MC-21-400 single-aisle twinjet could be jointly produced in the United Arab Emirates.

Variants with PD-14 engines will be designated MC-21-310 and MC-21-210.

Orders
By the end of the 2013 MAKS Air Show, there were 175 firm orders including 50 for Rostec subsidiary Aviakapital leased to Aeroflot and 35 more with PD-14 engines for governmental customers, 50 for Ilyushin Finance (10 to be leased to Red Wings Airlines and six to Transaero), 30 for VEB Leasing (10 to be leased to UTair Aviation and 6 to Transaero) and 10 for IrAero with an agreement for 20 others leased from Sberbank of Russia, for a potential 195 orders. Transaero bankrupted in 2015.

In June 2016, Azerbaijan Airlines tentatively signed to lease ten -300s from Ilyushin Finance.
By July 2018, 175 firm orders and nearly 150 intentions had been recorded.

At the 2019 MAKS Air Show, at Zhukovsky International Airport, Moscow, Bek Air signed a letter of intent for ten Irkut MC-21 aircraft, Yakutia Airlines likewise signed for five aircraft and an undisclosed customer for a further five aircraft. Delivery of the new aircraft was expected to be in the second half of 2021.

Cancelled orders

Accidents and incidents
On 18 January 2021, an MC-21-300 (prototype 73051) experienced a runway excursion at Zhukovsky Aerodrome and came to a stop in heavy snow during testing. There were no injuries to the crew.

Specifications

See also

Notes

References

External links

 
 
 UAC MC-21 (PDF) 

Twinjets
MS-21
Aircraft first flown in 2017
2010s Russian airliners
Low-wing aircraft